The Scottish Building Standards Agency was an executive agency of the Scottish Government. It was responsible for building standards regulations in Scotland.

The Agency was based in Livingston, West Lothian.

History 

The Agency was formed on 21 June 2004. It was set the responsibility to carry out the duties of the Scottish Government as set out in the Building (Scotland) Act 2003. The 2003 Act introduced a new building standards system in Scotland, which started on 1 May 2005.  The building standards system is set out to protect the public interest in the design, construction, conversion and demolition of buildings.  The system requires plans to be verified as meeting the standards set out in the regulations.

The agency was located in Livingston, in line with the Government's policy of relocating public sector jobs outwith Edinburgh. Staff from the existing building standards division of the Scottish Government were transferred to the Agency.

The Agency was disbanded on April 1, 2008, and its functions were transferred back to the Scottish Government.

Role 

The Agency described their functions as to:
to prepare the building regulations and write guidance on how to meet the regulations
to provide views on compliance to help verifiers make decisions
to grant relaxations of the regulations in exceptional cases
to maintain a register of Approved Certifiers
to monitor and audit the certification system
to monitor and audit the performance of verifiers
to verify Crown building work

References

External links 
 Scottish Building Standards Agency

Defunct bodies of the Scottish government
2004 establishments in Scotland
Government agencies established in 2004
Regulators of Scotland
2008 disestablishments in Scotland
Government agencies disestablished in 2008